The Queensland Legislative Council was the upper house of the parliament in the Australian state of Queensland. It was a fully nominated body which first took office on 1 May 1860. It was abolished by the Constitution Amendment Act 1921, which took effect on 23 March 1922.

Consequently, the Legislative Assembly of Queensland is the only unicameral state Parliament in Australia. Two territories, the Northern Territory and Australian Capital Territory, also maintain unicameral parliaments.

Most of the early members of the Council came from wealthy families, were well educated and were born in England. Absenteeism was a problem in the early years, with some members returning to England, being absent for several years.

Abolition
The Legislative Council was seen by the Labor Party as undemocratic and a tool of patronage, and upon the establishment of a secure Labor majority in the Assembly in 1915, Labor sought the house's abolition. Bills for this purpose were rejected by the Council itself in 1915 and 1916, and a referendum failed on 5 May 1917 on a vote of 179,105 to 116,196. In 1920, the Government under Premier Ted Theodore changed tack, persuading the Governor of Queensland to appoint additional Labor members of the Council, thus securing a majority in that Chamber.

The abolition bill was eventually passed by the Assembly on a 51–15 vote on 24 October 1921. The bill was then introduced to the Council by the leader of the Government in the Council, Alfred James Jones, who remarked, "Until we had a majority here, [the Council] was obstructive, and now that we have a majority here it is useless." However, Opposition councillor Patrick Leahy protested that the abolition of the chamber would result in the Assembly being "able to do what it thinks fit" and becoming unaccountable. On 26 October 1921, the Council voted itself out of existence; the members who voted for the abolition were known as the "suicide squad". The Council rose for the last time at 8:37 p.m. the next evening.

The non-Labor parties petitioned the British Government, but the Colonial Secretary, Winston Churchill, concluded that the matter was "essentially one for determination locally", and the Governor felt "unable to say that there is evidence of any strong or widespread feeling in the country against this assent being given." Royal Assent was given on 3 March 1922, and the Act was proclaimed in the Government Gazette 20 days later, abolishing the Council.

Labor's view was summed up in 1980 by Labor politician and historian Dr Denis Murphy, who claimed the "dominance of wealth and property over the Queensland parliament" was broken. However, some scholars and political commentators have argued that the excesses of the Bjelke-Petersen years (1968–1987) in Queensland were only possible because of the absence of a house of review, and that the problem was not the Council itself but its existence as a nominated rather than elected body (Legislative Councils in all other states were fully elective by 1900, except in New South Wales where some nominative features lasted until the 1970s.)

Several independents have at various times supported the reintroduction of an upper house. The Queensland Greens support the reintroduction of an upper house elected by proportional representation. Neither major party currently supports the reintroduction of an upper house.

Support for reintroduction
Since 2012, there has been support from some politicians for the reintroduction of the Legislative Council in the Queensland Parliament.

Federal Greens senator Larissa Waters, independent MPs Peter Wellington and Liz Cunningham, One Nation leader Pauline Hanson and One Nation MP Stephen Andrew have all publicly supported the return of the upper house, believing that both constituents and political parties would benefit with fairer representation.

However, LNP premier Campbell Newman and Labor premier Annastacia Palaszczuk have both publicly rejected the calls for the upper house to be reestablished.

On 11 May 2021, a petition was tabled in parliament which was submitted by Kallangur resident Daniel Boniface and sponsored by Member for Mirani Stephen Andrew requesting a referendum be held on the issue of reinstating the Legislative Council. The petition was signed by 940 people.  In a letter addressed to the Clerk of Parliament on 11 June 2021, premier Annastacia Palaszczuk responded that the issue was not one she had taken to the people, nor was it an issue her government intended to pursue.

List of presidents of the Legislative Council

See also

Members of the Queensland Legislative Council by year
:Category:Members of the Queensland Legislative Council by name

Notes

References

Further reading

External links
 
 Constitution Act Amendment Act of 1921
 Factsheet - Abolition of the Legislative Council (Queensland Parliament)
 Abolition of the Upper House - Information on Parliament and Government in Queensland
 

 
Defunct upper houses
Historical legislatures
Parliament of Queensland
Queensland
1922 disestablishments in Australia
1860 establishments in Australia